Gary Yates (born in Montreal, Quebec) is a Canadian film director, producer, and screenwriter. His films include Seven Times Lucky, High Life, Niagara Motel and  Taken in Broad Daylight.

Yates’ films have won eight international awards and been nominated for twelve Genie Awards and six Director's Guild Awards. His feature film Seven Times Lucky premiered at the Sundance Film Festival and won Best Film and Best Screenplay at the Method Fest Film Festival in Los Angeles. His heist-comedy High Life premiered at the Berlin Film Festival. Johanna Schneller named High Life one of the 10 Best Films of 2010.

References

External links

Film directors from Montreal
Living people
Writers from Montreal
Canadian male screenwriters
Year of birth missing (living people)